Wig Wam Bam is a graphic novel by Jaime Hernandez, serialized in Love and Rockets in 1990–93 and collected in 1994.

Synopsis

Background and publication
Love and Rockets is an alternative comic book that showcased the work of the Hernandez brothers—Mario (b. 1953), Gilbert (b. 1957), and Jaime (b. 1959). Most of Jaime's work focused on a group of young women—primarily two named Maggie and Hopey—that have come to be called the Locas stories. The early ones take place in a science fiction world that Jaime was to abandon for character-centered stories in a realistic world, drawn in a slick, streamlined style combining realistic anatomy with traditional cartooning techniques.

Publication
The serialization of Wig Wam Bam appeared from June 1990 to August 1993 in Love and Rockets 33–39 and 42. It first appeared in collected form in The Complete Love and Rockets, Volume 11 in 1994.

Style and analysis
At 120 pages, Wig Wam Bam is the longest of the Locas stories. The narrative unfolds among a series of unannounced flashbacks.

References

Works cited

Further reading

1994 graphic novels
American graphic novels
Fantagraphics titles
Jaime Hernandez